The 1988 McDonald's All-American Boys Game was an All-star basketball game played on Sunday, April 17, 1988 at The Pit in Albuquerque, New Mexico. The game's rosters featured the best and most highly recruited high school boys graduating in 1988. The game was the 11th annual version of the McDonald's All-American Game first played in 1978.

1988 game
The game was telecast live by ABC. The East team had many forwards and centers in its roster, among them Alonzo Mourning and Billy Owens, two of the top-ranked big men of their class. Kenny Williams, another highly regarded prospect, was selected but did not play. Chris Jackson, the highest ranked point guard in the nation, was also part of the East team. The West had Shawn Kemp and LaPhonso Ellis, two other forwards/centers who were in the top positions of the high school rankings, along with Darrick Martin and Lee Mayberry, two of the best guards. Mourning was the top scorer of the East with 16 points, while Owens had 10 points and 14 rebounds; Jackson scored 13 points and Malik Sealy had 12. Kemp scored 18 (the highest number of points in the game), while Todd Day had 15 points. Mourning and Owens were selected as co-MVPs. Of the 25 players, 21 went on to play at least 1 game in the NBA.

East roster

West roster

Coaches
The East team was coached by:
 Head coach Bob Hurley of St. Anthony (Jersey City, New Jersey)

The West team was coached by:
 Head coach Jim Hulsman of Albuquerque High School (Albuquerque, New Mexico)

All-American Week

Contest winners 
 The 1988 Slam Dunk contest was won by Matt Steigenga.

References

External links
McDonald's All-American on the web
McDonald's All-American all-time rosters
McDonald's All-American rosters at Basketball-Reference.com
Game stats at Realgm.com

1987–88 in American basketball
1988
Basketball competitions in New Mexico
Sports in Albuquerque, New Mexico
1980s in sports in New Mexico